The men's 10,000 metres at the 1962 European Athletics Championships was held in Belgrade, then Yugoslavia, at JNA Stadium on 12 September 1962.

Medalists

Results

Final
12 September

Participation
According to an unofficial count, 26 athletes from 17 countries participated in the event.

 (1)
 (1)
 (2)
 (2)
 (3)
 (1)
 (1)
 (1)
 (1)
 (1)
 (1)
 (3)
 (1)
 (1)
 (3)
 (1)
 (2)

References

10000 metres
10,000 metres at the European Athletics Championships
International athletics competitions hosted by Yugoslavia